The People's Comics is a single-issue underground comic book drawn and written largely by Robert Crumb, with a young Harvey Pekar writing a back cover feature. The book is notable for containing the death sequence of Fritz the Cat following Crumb's disappointment with Ralph Bakshi's 1972 film involving the character.

Publication history 
Terry Zwigoff's Golden Gate Publishing Company published the original printing of the comic. Zwigoff soon sold his company's printing rights to Kitchen Sink Press, which published the following six printings.

Reception 
Underground comix database Comixjoint gave The People's Comics an 8/10 rating, calling the writing "excellent" and the illustration "exceptional". Writer M. Steven Fox noted of the book's stories that "Beyond "Fritz the Cat, Superstar", the insightful "Confessions of R. Crumb" provides plenty to chew on. Crumb conveys a dreadful world filled with appalling people, mundane exercises, inescapable forces and compulsive obsessions, and how living on this planet fucks us up from the day we're born".

References

Underground comix
1972 comics debuts
1972 comics endings
Comics by Robert Crumb
Fritz the Cat
1972 in comics